Michaela Louise Kirk (born 30 June 1999) is a South African cricketer who currently plays for The Blaze. She plays as a right-handed batter, right-arm off break bowler and occasional wicket-keeper. Having played for Northerns in South Africa between 2012/13 and 2019/20, in 2021 she moved to England to play cricket there, with ambitions to qualify for the national side.

Early life
Kirk was born on 30 June 1999 in Johannesburg. Her grandparents are from Edinburgh, which contributed to her family's decision to move back to England in 2021.

Domestic career

South Africa
Kirk made her debut for Northerns in 2012, against Easterns. In her second season with the side, 2013/14, she took 6 wickets at an average of 7.00 in the Provincial T20 Competition. In 2015/16, she was her side's second-leading run-scorer and second-leading wicket-taker, with 146 runs and 9 wickets (including a best bowling of 4/29). In the 2016/17 season, Kirk made her maiden half-century, scoring 52* against Easterns. The following season she achieved her List A best bowling figures, taking 4 wickets for 0 runs in 1.3 overs against Easterns. In 2019/20 she was her side's leading run scorer in both the Provincial League and the Provincial T20, with 140 runs and 127 runs, respectively. She has also appeared in the Women's T20 Super League for Duchesses.

England
In 2021, Kirk moved to England, moving in with her grandparents and aiming to qualify to play for the national side. For the 2021 season, she signed to play for Nottinghamshire in the Twenty20 Cup, Lightning in the regional competitions and Trent Rockets in The Hundred. 

For Nottinghamshire, she helped them win the East Midlands Group of the Twenty20 Cup and scored 122 runs at an average of 61.00, including hitting 61* on debut against Northamptonshire. She made her debut for Lightning on 29 May, against Southern Vipers in the Rachael Heyhoe Flint Trophy. She went on to play four matches in the Rachael Heyhoe Flint Trophy, scoring one half-century, 57 made against Sunrisers. She also played three matches for the side in the Charlotte Edwards Cup, and three matches for Trent Rockets in The Hundred. During The Hundred in 2021, Kirk injured her anterior cruciate ligament, meaning that she missed the rest of the season, and most of the following season. In 2022, therefore, she only appeared in two matches for Lightning, both in September in the Rachael Heyhoe Flint Trophy.

References

External links

1999 births
Living people
Cricketers from Johannesburg
Northerns women cricketers
Nottinghamshire women cricketers
The Blaze women's cricketers
Trent Rockets cricketers